The Cummins C Series engine is a straight-six diesel engine with a displacement of .  Cummins began producing the engines in 1998.  The engine was based on its predecessor, the Cummins C 8.3-litre engine originally introduced in 1985 as the 6C8.3 (this was co-designed with the Case Corporation, along with the smaller 6B5.9).  The first electronic version, known as the C8.3E and designed for the urban bus market exclusively, went into production in late 1996.

By late 2003, Cummins announced that they will revise the engine to sport a High-Pressure Common-Rail (HPCR) system to help with emissions and also a variable geometry turbocharger system to help with the performance on this engine.

The Cummins ISC also has a sister engine which is designed off the existing ISC 8.3-litre cylinder block which runs on compressed natural gas (CNG). A few thousand units of this engine are now roaming in the world operating on a variety of applications.

Applications

Medium Duty Trucks
Buses
Marine
Excavators
Fork Lifts
Generators
Heavy Equipment

Popular power ratings
Excavator 
 @ 1,300 rpm,  electronically governed at 2,400 rpm
 @ 1,300 rpm,  electronically governed at 2,500 rpm
 @ 1,300 rpm,  electronically governed at 2,500 rpm
 @ 1,300 rpm,  electronically governed at 2,500 rpm
Generators 
 @ 1,300 rpm,  electronically governed at 2,200 rpm
 @ 1,300 rpm,  electronically governed at 2,500 rpm
 @ 1,300 rpm,  electronically governed at 2,500 rpm
 @ 1,300 rpm,  electronically governed at 2,500 rpm
 @ 1,300 rpm,  electronically governed at 2,500 rpm
 @ 1,300 rpm,  electronically governed at 2,400 rpm

Excavator /generator 
 @ 1,300 rpm,  electronically governed at 2,500 rpm
 @ 1,300 rpm,  electronically governed at 2,500 rpm
 @ 1,300 rpm,  electronically governed at 2,400 rpm

References

 CumminsEngines.com.(2011). http://cumminsengines.com/sites/every/applications/motorhome/EPA_2010_ISC83_MH.page

External links
Cummins.com official website

Cummins diesel engines
Diesel engines by model
Straight-six engines